The Funtastic World of Hanna-Barbera Arena Show is a 1981 live-action/animated variety television special produced by Hanna-Barbera Productions which premiered on NBC on June 25, 1981.

Overview
The special, hosted by guest Michael Landon and his family, was broadcast from Perth Entertainment Centre in Perth, Australia and featured costumed Hanna-Barbera characters such as Fred Flintstone, Yogi Bear, Huckleberry Hound, Scooby-Doo and Top Cat on roller stakes.

The show tells the story of the search for Dino, The Flintstones's pet dinosaur; in between segments, highlights include a huge volcano spewing red-hot disco dancers, life-size dancing billiard balls and dominoes, a 32-foot-long dancing skeleton, a phantom ghost ship and a spectacular three-ring circus.

Voices
 Sammy Davis Jr. as The Cheshire Cat
 Henry Corden as Fred Flintstone
 Casey Kasem as Shaggy
 Allan Melvin as Magilla Gorilla
 Don Messick as Boo-Boo Bear, Muttley, Scooby-Doo
 Janet Waldo as Judy Jetson
 Arnold Stang as Top Cat

External links
 The Funtastic World of Hanna-Barbera Arena Show at the Paley Center for Media
 The Funtastic World of Hanna-Barbera Arena Show at Hollywood.com

1981 television specials
1980s American television specials
American films with live action and animation
NBC television specials
Music television specials
Animated crossover television specials
Hanna-Barbera television specials